The 1919 Norfolk race riot occurred on July 21, 1919, when a homecoming celebration for African-American veterans of World War I was attacked in Norfolk, Virginia. At least two people were killed and six people were shot. City officials called in Marines and Navy personnel to restore order.

Background

World War I ended with the signing of the Armistice of November 11, 1918. Though the fighting stopped, the war's potential to resume still existed and peace was only reached when representatives of Germany signed the Treaty of Versailles on June 28, 1919, exactly five years after the assassination of Archduke Franz Ferdinand. The United States entered the war after it had been raging for years. When it did send men to the fronts of Europe, the U.S. armed forces remained segregated, with all-black and all-white units. Despite the segregation, many African Americans still volunteered to join the Allied war effort. By the time of the armistice with Germany, more than 350,000 African Americans had joined the military and risked their lives to serve with the American Expeditionary Force on the Western Front.

In days prior to the riot, tensions were inflamed when civil unrest broke out in the nearby Washington Race Riot. Dozens were killed and even more injured in that riot.

Incident
In July 1919, residents of Norfolk, Virginia, planned a week-long celebration to honor the return of black troops to their city. During the celebration, it was alleged that a fight broke out between African Americans attending the event. White police moved in to make arrests, which sparked a riot that quickly spread to the black neighborhoods of the city. Alarmed, the city authorities called in police reserves and requested help from the navy. The naval base armed 100 sailors and 18 marines, and sent them into the fray to restore order. The clashes between whites and blacks that day resulted in two deaths and several injuries. Police officers C.H. Sheldon and B.C. Vick were shot in the foot and the leg, respectively.

Aftermath

The uprising in Norfolk was one of several incidents of civil unrest that are now known as the American Red Summer of 1919. Attacks on black communities and white oppression spread to more than three dozen cities and counties. In most cases, white mobs attacked African American neighborhoods. In some cases, black community groups resisted the attacks, especially in Chicago and Washington, D.C. Most deaths occurred in rural areas during events like the Elaine race riot in Arkansas, where an estimated 100 to 240 blacks and 5 whites were killed. Other major events of Red Summer were the Chicago race riot and Washington D.C. Race Riot, which caused 38 and 39 deaths, respectively. Both riots had many more non-fatal injuries and extensive property damage reaching up into the millions of dollars.

See also

Washington race riot of 1919
Mass racial violence in the United States
List of incidents of civil unrest in the United States

Bibliography 
Notes

References 

 
 - Total pages: 368  

Red Summer
History of Norfolk, Virginia
African-American history between emancipation and the civil rights movement
White American riots in the United States
1919 riots in the United States
Racially motivated violence against African Americans
History of racism in Virginia
Riots and civil disorder in Virginia
July 1919 events
African-American history of Virginia